Emetullah Rabia Gülnuş Sultan ("Servant of Allah", "spring" and "Essence of rose", 1642 – 6 November 1715, Edirne) was the Haseki Sultan of Ottoman Sultan Mehmed IV and Valide sultan to their sons Mustafa II and Ahmed III. In the early 18th century, she became the most powerful and influential woman in the Ottoman Empire.

Early life
Gülnuş Sultan was born in 1642 in the town of Rethymno, Crete, when the island was under Venetian rule; she was originally named Evmania Voria (Ευμενία Βόρια) and she was an ethnic Greek, the daughter of a Greek Orthodox priest. She was captured by the Ottomans during the invasion of Crete in 1645.

Time as consort
The Ottoman army invaded the island during the Cretan War (1645–1669); she was captured as a very young girl when the Ottomans conquered Rethymno in 1645, taken as slave and was sent to Constantinople. She was renamed Emetullah Rabia Gülnuş and was given a thoroughly Ottoman education in the harem department of Topkapi Palace and soon attracted the attention of the Sultan, Mehmed IV. He was famous for his hunting expeditions in the Balkans and used to take her, his favourite, to these expeditions. She was described as a curvy woman with long black curly hair.  They had two sons both of whom became the future Sultans, Mustafa II (born 1664; died 1703) and Ahmed III (born 1673; died 1736). Ahmed was born in Dobruca during one of the hunting expeditions of Mehmed IV. Her rivalry with Gülbeyaz, an odalisque of Mehmed IV led to a tragic end. Sultan Mehmed had been deeply enamored of her, but after Gülbeyaz entered his harem, his affections began to shift; Gülnuş, who was still in love with the sultan, became madly jealous. One day, as Gülbeyaz was sitting on a rock and watching the sea, Gülnuş slightly pushed her off the cliff and drowned the young odalisque, or according to others she ordered Gülbeyaz's strangulation in the Kandilli Palace. Some writers stress the fact that Gülnuş was a ruthless person claiming that she attempted to have her husband's brothers Suleiman II and Ahmed II strangled after she gave birth to her firstborn Mustafa, but that Mother Turhan Hatice Sultan had hindered these attempted murders.

She accompanied Mehmed, Turhan Sultan, Prince Mustafa and Mehmed's sisters, together with a large entourage, in processions marking the Polish war in 1672 and 1673. In 1683, she joined a similar large entourage in a procession marking the siege of Vienna. Gülnus also established networks of support within the imperial court. She allied with Yusuf Agha, the chief eunuch of the imperial harem at that time. Her addition, was the administrator of the pious foundation that she founded in 1680 and provided income for a hospital and public kitchens in Mecca. Moreover, Gülnus's chamberlain, Mehter Osman Agha, was an apprentice and protégé of Yusuf Agha.

Gülnus also enjoyed close relations with Feyzullah Efendi, who served as tutor to her son Mustafa. These relations still remained even after the disastrous collapse of the siege of Vienna in 1683 as a result of which his influence at the court fell sharply. Thus, in an incident dating to 1686, when he let his horse graze in the royal garden, it was decided that he had to be punished. Gülnus intervened to save him and he was assigned a new post. In 1672, Amcazade Hüseyin, nephew of Koprülü Mehmed Pasha, met Mehmed and Gülnus on the way to the Polish war. He later joined her household serving therein for an extended period and became her chief billeting officer in 1682. She also played a role in determining the careers of various statesmen, including the grand vizier Kara Mustafa Pasha. After the failure after the siege of Vienna in 1683, he was stripped of his office and executed, after a considerable lobbying effort of Gülnus and the court eunuchs. She also had influence during the vizierate of Fazil Ahmed Pasha, which rose after Kara Mustafa Pasha's execution.

As Valide Sultan

First reign
She became Valide in 1695 when her older son Mustafa II became the Sultan. She held the position during the reign of two sons. When Mustafa II was dethroned in 1703 the populace blamed Gülnuş, for his preference for Edirne over Constantinople as a place of residence and for the general confusion of life in the capital.

She of course had more freedom of movement and contacts than the kadıns. Quite often she accompanied her son. She visited her daughters in their palaces, took part in the wedding of her daughter Fatma Sultan at the side of her son, visited her daughter Hatice Sultan in company of the sultan, after she had given birth to a daughter. She looked at parades, visited Eyüb, received the Grand vizier and the Şeyhüislam and accepted invitations by the Grand vizier and the Bostancıbaşı (with her son). She had hass (private domains) and a Kethüda (steward) who administered them for her. Mustafa kept close contacts with his mother, he honored her demonstratively whenever there was an occasion, he sent her information, asked for her well-being and received many, many horses as gifts from her. He even prohibited that anybody should stay in a house in Çorlu, between Constantinople and Edirne, in which his mother had spent a night.

Second reign
She did have some political importance. In 1703, she was asked to confirm and approve of the succession of her other son, Ahmed III, to the throne, which she also did. Ahmed III thought it prudent to keep her out of sight until the feeling against her had died down. And so, on her return from Edirne, she went to the Old Palace for a time.

She is also attributed to having advised her son to the war with Russia in 1711. In 1709, king Charles XII of Sweden settled in Bender within the Ottoman Empire during his war with Russia. He wished the sultan to declare war against Russia and form an alliance with Sweden. The sultan was rumoured to listen to the advice of his mother, who had a large influence over him. They bribed a convert named Goin, formerly a Frenchman, who worked as a doctor in the palace. Goin arranged a meeting with the personal slave of the Valide, a Jewish woman, who they gave a personal letter to the Valide. They were also introduced to the Hungarian eunuch Horwath, who became their propaganda person in the harem. The Valide became intrigued by Charles, took an interest in his cause, and even corresponded with him in Bender. On 9 February 1711, Turkey declared war against Russia, as the sultan had been advised to by his mother, who convinced him that Charles was a man worth taking a risk for.

Patroness of architecture
Among Gülnuş's projects was a complex of buildings which included a mosque, soup kitchen, school, fountain and tomb, built in Üsküdar. She also sponsored the transformation of a church in Galata into a mosque and building of five fountains with which clean water was finally made available to the area. She also made endowments in Edirne, Chios, Mecca, Medina, Kastamonu, and Menemen. After the reconquest of the island of Chios in 1695, a church was converted into a mosque in her name. She also constructed a fountain next to the mosque in Chios.

Death

Gülnuş Sultan died on 6 November 1715 in Istanbul during the reign of her son Ahmed III just before the start of the era of prosperity and peace called the Tulip (Lâle) Era by the Turkish historians. She is buried at a tomb that is open to sky, that is near the mosque she bequeathed to be built at Üsküdar on the Anatolian side of Istanbul, called the Yeni Valide Mosque.

Issue
With Mehmed IV, Gülnuş Sultan had two sons and four daughters:

Sons
 Mustafa II (Edirne or Constantinople, February 6 or June 5, 1664 - Constantinople, December 20 or 29, 1703). He was the 22nd  Sultan of the Ottoman Empire. 
 Ahmed III (Romania, December 31, 1673 - Constantinople, July 1, 1736). He was the first sultan to be born in the province after  Suleiman I. He became the 23rd Sultan of the Ottoman Empire, taking the throne after the deposition of his brother.

Daughters  
  Hatice Sultan (Edirne or Constantinople,  1660 - Edirne, 5 July 1743). She married twice and had five sons and a daughter. It was one of the longest-lived Ottoman sultanas. 
 Ayşe Sultan (Constantinople or Edirne,  1673 - Constantinople,  1676). Nicknamed Küçük Sultan, that means " little princess ". At the age of two she was betrothed to  Kara Mustafa Paşah, but the baby girl died shortly after and the marriage never took place. 
  Ümmügülsüm Sultan (Constantinople,  1677 - Constantinople, 9 May 1720). Also called Ümmi Sultan or Gülsüm Sultan. She was the favorite niece of his uncle Ahmed II, who after the deposition of her father treated her as his daughter, so much so that he kept her at court with him, unlike his sisters. She married once and had three daughters. She was buried in the Yeni Cami Mosque.
  Fatma Emetullah Sultan (Edirne or Constantinople,  1679 - 13 December 1700). She married twice and had two daughters.

See also
List of Valide Sultans
List of consorts of the Ottoman Sultans

Annotations

References

Sources

External Links 

1642 births
1715 deaths
People from Rethymno
Converts to Islam
Greek Muslims
Converts to Islam from Eastern Orthodoxy
Former Greek Orthodox Christians
Greeks from the Ottoman Empire
17th-century consorts of Ottoman sultans
18th-century consorts of Ottoman sultans
Valide sultan
Greek slaves from the Ottoman Empire
Date of birth unknown
17th-century slaves